Naor Peser (born October 15, 1985) is an Israeli footballer who currently plays for Hapoel Ashkelon. He previously played in the Israeli Premier League for Maccabi Petah Tikva and Hapoel Ramat HaSharon.

References

1985 births
Living people
Israeli footballers
Maccabi Petah Tikva F.C. players
Hapoel Nir Ramat HaSharon F.C. players
Hapoel Marmorek F.C. players
Hapoel Ashkelon F.C. players
Israeli Premier League players
Liga Leumit players
Footballers from Hadera
Association football defenders
Israel under-21 international footballers